Mohammed Mahjoub (Arabic:محمد محجوب) (born 20 January 1994) is a Sudanese born-Qatari footballer. He currently plays as a winger .

Career
He formerly played for Al-Gharafa, Al-Rayyan, Al-Shahania, Mesaimeer and Al-Waab .

External links

References

Living people
1994 births
Qatari footballers
Qatari people of Sudanese descent
Naturalised citizens of Qatar
Sudanese emigrants to Qatar
Al-Gharafa SC players
Al-Rayyan SC players
Al-Shahania SC players
Mesaimeer SC players
Al-Waab SC players
Qatar Stars League players
Qatari Second Division players
Association football wingers
Twin sportspeople
Place of birth missing (living people)